On February 4, 1888, Spanish civil guards fired on a crowd of protesting Rio Tinto Company mineworkers in Zalamea, killing 13 and injuring 35.

Background 

In early 1888, Anti-Smoke League agriculturalists and Rio Tinto workers came together to protest the company practice of open-air pyrite calcination in blast furnaces. It was an unlikely alliance, as the Anti-Smoke League desired an end to calcination, based on what the toxic fumes did to local farmland, but the workers understood its necessity and were willing to accept recompense in exchange for periods when smoke prevented normal work. The anarchist protest leaders held that they shared more important long-term goals, however, of deposing foreign capitalist interests, and used the issue of fumes to stand a class-based opposition to Rio Tinto. Beginning in January, the Anti-Smoke League funded the militant anarchist Maximiliano Tornet, formerly of Cuba, to roil the workers to action, resulting in demands for improved pay and conditions. Other area anarchist groups pledged their support to protest against the company.

Protest and massacre 

At noon on February 4, 1888, several thousand rank and file—agriculturalists, anarchists, and mikeworkers—marched from Zalamea to the Rio Tinto town hall (ayuntamiento) to deliver their petitions to the mayor. While the mayor spoke with the crowd's representatives, the Huelva military governor and civil guards watched over the protest. The military governor's attempts to disperse the crowd only incensed it further. The civil guards, under perceived threat of mob violence, fired on the crowd, killing 13 and injuring 35. Other casualty estimates vary widely. One counts 45 dead and 70–100 wounded.

Aftermath and legacy 

Having failed in the protest's aims, a number of workers turned from anarchism to socialism for social change, though mineworkers would largely continue to associate with anarchism for another decade. The protest's leaders, including Tornet, left or were driven from the mines. Anarchism in the region returned to a more collectivist approach, with specific, targeted strikes rather than general strikes.

Charles E. Harvey, who wrote a history of the Rio Tinto Company, described this protest as the only regional example prior to 1900 of anarchist action based on confronting class differences ("communalist" anarchism) as opposed to reformist actions based on unions ("collectivist" anarchism).

See also 

 Rio Tinto Company Limited
 Riotinto Railway

References

Bibliography

Further reading 

 
 
 
 

February 1888 events
Massacres in 1888
Massacres in Spain
Anarchism in Spain
Mining in Spain
Rio Tinto (corporation)
Labour disputes in Spain
Environmental protests